Marie-Claire Pauwels (3 September 1945, 15th arrondissement of Paris – 22 May 2011) was a French journalist, the daughter of Suzanne Brégeon and Louis Pauwels. In April 1980, she launched the magazine Madame Figaro of which she became the first editor-in-chief and received the Prix Roger Nimier in 2003 for her autobiographical work Fille à papa.

In 1975, she created the magazine Jacinte of which she became editor-in-chief until 1980. She then took over, under the authority of her father, the direction of the women sections of Le Figaro Magazine.

Bibliography 
1988: Mon chéri, Éditions Flammarion ; 1989, J'ai lu, 
2002: Fille à papa, Albin Michel,  — Prix Roger Nimier (2003)

References

External links 
 Marie-Claire Pauwels on Who's Who
 Stéphane Bern on Marie-Claire Pauwels in Le Figaro

Writers from Paris
1945 births
2011 deaths
20th-century French journalists
French women journalists
Roger Nimier Prize winners
Deaths from cancer in France
20th-century French women